Lora Patricia Romero was an American assistant professor of English at Stanford University. She specialized in 19th and 20th century American literature, Chicano/a cultural studies, and gender theory.

Life and work 
Romero was born in Chino, California in 1960. She graduated from Stanford University and earned her master's and doctoral degrees from the University of California, Berkeley. Romero was a former Ford Foundation Postdoctoral Fellow and also served as a member of the National Council of the American Studies Association. She taught at Princeton University and the University of Texas before accepting a position in the Stanford English Department in 1993.

Her first and only book, Home Fronts: Domesticity and Its Critics in the United States, 1820-1870, was published by Duke University Press and appeared in print just days after her death.

Legacy 
The American Studies Association annually awards the Lora Romero First Book Prize in her honor.

The University of Texas at Austin offers a scholarship entitled the Lora Romero Memorial Award for Interdisciplinary Research in Race, Ethnicity and Gender.

References

1960 births
1997 deaths
Stanford University faculty
Stanford University alumni
University of California, Berkeley alumni